Yevgeni Antonovich Kozlovsky (born 6 September 1946, in Vladivostok (Russia)) is a Russian writer, journalist, theatre director  and film director. He lives in Moscow.

Biography

Bibliography

Tales 
 Moskvaburgskiye povesti / Tales of Moscowburg
 1980 — Dissident i chinovnitsa / Dissident and Bureaucrat Woman (a story about real event)
 1980 — Malen'ky bely golub' mira / The Small White Dove of Peace (a story with unbelievable conclusion)
 1980—1981 — K'gasnaya ploschad' / 'Ged Square (a tale with two murders)
 1982—1983 — Vodovozov i syn / Vodovozov and Son (a tale of departure)
 1983 — Shanel' / Chanel (a tale about end of the beautiful age told on behalf of photographer)
 1984 — Golos Ameriki / Voice of America (a sci-fi epilogue)

Plays 
 Dushny teatr / Stuffy Theatre (a book of six plays)
 Vera. Nadezhda. Lyubov' (a play in three acts)
 1981 — Video / The Video (a comic play in one act)
 1984 — Boks / The Box (a folklore melodrama in one act)
 1987 — Pulya / The Bullet (a farce in one act)
 Moguschestvo Rossii / Might of Russia (a dramatic trilogy)
 1987 — Ruf' / Ruth (a comedy from the past times)
 1986 — Mesto rozhdeniya ili Perehod po zebre / Place of Birth or Passage On "Zebra" (a tragedy without catharsis)
 1987 — Mnogo kostey ili Veter P. / Many Bones or The P. Wind (a detective drama in two acts)

Novel 
 1974–1979, 1986 — My vstretilis' v rayu... / We've Met In Paradise...

Film Scripts 
 1988 — Kvartira / The Flat (a sentimental story happened at the edge of the Empire on the eve of its destruction)
 1990 — Kak zhivete?.. / How Do You Live?.. (an incest story)
 1990 — Guvernantka / The Governess (a story about two prostitutes)
 1990—1991 — Ya obeschala, i ya uydu... / I Promised, So I'll Go Away (a story of love and death)
 1991—1992 — Chetyre lista fanery / Four Sheets Of Plywood (a story of a private investigation)
 1992 — Grekh / The Sin (a story of the passion)

Poems 
 1985 — Ole v al'bom / Into Olga's Album (the fourth book of poems)

Cinema Works

Theatre Works

External links 
 Homepage of Eugene Kozlovsky
 
 Eugene Kozlovsky's works at the Maksim Moshkow's Library
 "Ogorod Kozlovskogo" / "Kozlovsky's Garden" at the Computerra website
 Eugene Kozlovsky's Photo Gallery at Fotki.com

Russian male short story writers
Soviet short story writers
20th-century Russian short story writers
Russian male novelists
Soviet novelists
Soviet male writers
20th-century Russian male writers
Russian journalists
Russian dramatists and playwrights
Russian male dramatists and playwrights
Soviet dramatists and playwrights
Russian male poets
Writers from Moscow
1946 births
Living people
Moscow Art Theatre School alumni
Writers from Vladivostok
Mass media people from Vladivostok